Lampris immaculatus, commonly known as the southern opah or southern moonfish, is a species of fish native to the Southern Ocean. The species is found commonly in New Zealand waters. They are caught commercially using long-line fishery in New Zealand. The most common prey species for the southern opah are juvenile onychoteuthid squid Moroteuthis ingens, which were found in 93% of 69 fish. It was discovered that 14% of the opahs contained plastic pollutants in their digestive tract, which indicates signs of high plastic pollution in the Southwest Atlantic.

References

Lampridae
Fish described in 1904
Fish of the Southern Ocean
Fish of New Zealand